The Gold Coast Eagles Rugby Union Football Club is an Australian rugby union football club that competes in the Gold Coast and District Rugby Union competition. The club is based in Southport on  Queensland's Gold Coast.

History
The foundation club for rugby union on the Gold Coast was the Gold Coast Eagles. The club was registered with the Queensland Rugby Union (QRU) after a positive response at the initial foundation meeting in late 1964.

See also

 Sports on the Gold Coast, Queensland
 Rugby union in Queensland
 List of Australian rugby union teams

References

External links

Rugby union teams in Queensland
Rugby clubs established in 1965
1965 establishments in Australia
Southport, Queensland
Rugby union teams on the Gold Coast, Queensland